Before his accession as king, Charles III received numerous awards by various organizations around the world, mostly, for his contributions on the environment including organic farming, gardening, climate change, and architecture.

Environmental awards
Overall

2002: EuroNatur Award for Environmental Excellence by the EuroNatur Awards
2007: Global Environmental Citizen Award by the Harvard Medical School Center for Health and the Global Environment
2008: St. Thomas Aquinas Environmental Award by Tulane University
2009: Global Empowerment Award by the Asian Women of Achievement Awards
2010: Great Gold Medal by Masaryk University
2016: Londoner of the Decade award by The London Evening Standard's Progress 1000 Awards

Organic farming and food
2006: Outstanding Public Expression Award by the OSSA Awards, joint award with the  Duchess of Cornwall
2007: World Farming Award by Compassion in World Farming
2010: National Agricultural Award by the Royal Agricultural Society of England’s (RASE)
2012: George Hedley Memorial Award by the National Sheep Association
2013: The Royal Smithfield Club Bicentenary Trophy Award by the Smithfield Club
2015: Prix Francois Rabelais award by the Institut de France

Conservation
2011: Royal Society for the Protection of Birds Medal by the Royal Society for the Protection of Birds (RSPB)
2015 : Teddy Roosevelt International Conservation Award by the International Conservation Caucus Foundation (ICCF)

Ecology
2003: World Ecology Award by The International Center for Tropical Ecology at the University of Missouri-St. Louis.
2009: German Sustainability Award by the German Sustainability Award organization

Gardening
2001: Silver Medal for  Islamic-style show garden by Chelsea Flower Show
2009: Victoria Medal of Honour (presented by The Queen) by the Royal Horticultural Society

Climate change
2006:  Awareness Award by The British Environment and Media Awards (BEMAs)
2009: Friend of the Forest and Climate Award by Conservation International (CI) and the Brazilian state of Amazonas

Architecture

1991: First Lewis Mumford Award by Architects/Designers/Planners for Social Responsibility organization (ADPSR)
2005: Vincent Scully Prize by the National Building Museum
2005: International Environmental Arts Award by the International Center for Environmental Arts (ICEA)
2008: Congress for the New Urbanism (CNU) Athena Medal Award by the Athena Awards
2011: 25th anniversary CEM Property Award by The College of Estate Management
2012: The Richard H. Driehaus Prize by the University of Notre Dame School of Architecture
2013: Albert Simons Medal of Excellence by the Historic Preservation and Community Planning Program at the College of Charleston School of the Arts

Art awards

Contemporary
2001: City of Florence Prize (20 lithographs of his watercolour paintings illustrating his country estates have been exhibited at The Florence International Biennale Exhibition of Contemporary Art
2011: Montblanc de la Culture Arts Patronage Award by the Montblanc Cultural Foundation

Lifetime achievement awards
2008: Rainforest Alliance Lifetime Achievement Award by the Rainforest Alliance
2011: Special Award for The Promotion of Gardening by the Garden Media Guild
2012: Lifetime achievement award by the International Green Awards
2018: Editor's Lifetime Achievement Award For Services To Philanthropy by GQ Awards
2020: Lifetime Achievement Award for Contributions to Farming by Farmers Weekly

See also
List of titles and honours of Charles III

References

Charles III
Lists of awards received by person